Mount Wyss is a peak in Antarctica. It is 1,930 m high, standing 3 nautical miles (6 km) east of Mount Rotoiti in the Frigate Range. Mapped by the United States Geological Survey (USGS) from tellurometer surveys and Navy air photos, 1960–62. Named by Advisory Committee on Antarctic Names (US-ACAN) for Orville Wyss, United States Antarctic Research Program (USARP) biologist at McMurdo Station, 1962–63.

Mountains of the Ross Dependency
Shackleton Coast